Juan Carlos I is a multi-purpose amphibious assault ship-aircraft carrier in the Spanish Navy (Armada Española). Similar in role to many aircraft carriers, the amphibious landing ship has a ski jump for STOVL operations, and is equipped with the McDonnell Douglas AV-8B Harrier II attack aircraft or the new Lockheed Martin F-35B Lightning II fighter aircraft. The vessel is named in honour of Juan Carlos I, the former King of Spain.

Design
The design for the Buque de Proyección Estratégica (Strategic Projection Vessel), as it was initially known, was approved in September 2003.

The ship's flight deck has eight landing spots for Harrier, F-35 Lightning II or medium-sized helicopters, four spots for heavy helicopters of the CH-47 Chinook or V-22 Osprey size. The ship can carry either 30 helicopters or 10/12 McDonnell Douglas AV-8B Harrier II or Lockheed Martin F-35 Lightning II and 10/12 helicopters,  using the light vehicles bay as an additional storage zone.

The ship uses diesel-electric propulsion, simultaneously connecting both diesels and the new technology gas turbine powerplant to a pair of azimuthal pods, for the first time in the Spanish Navy.

The complement of the ship is approximately 900 naval personnel, with equipment and support elements for 1,200 soldiers. A stern well deck measuring  can accommodate four LCM-1E landing craft which can beach-deliver non-swimming ground vehicles like tanks and four RHIBs, or one Landing Craft Air Cushion plus Assault Amphibious Vehicles.

Construction

The ship, that supposes a service load of 3,100,000 hours of production and 775,000 hours of engineering, was launched 10 March 2008, and was commissioned 30 September 2010. The original budget was €360 million but the ship cost €462 million (US$600 million) in the end.

Exports

Australia

Navantia was responsible for the ships' construction from the keel to the flight deck in Spain, after which the hulls were transported to Australia for completion by BAE Systems Australia. The first of these ships, was commissioned on 28 November 2014; the second ship, was commissioned on 4 December 2015.

Russia
In September 2009, Russia invited Navantia to take part in the competition to supply the Russian Navy with the new generation of amphibious assault ships to compete against the French Mistral-class ships. In January 2011 Russia chose the Mistral proposal over the Spanish concept.

Licensing

Turkey

It will feature local command and control systems, the combat system will be integrated by ASELSAN and HAVELSAN. In December 2013, the Turkish Navy's amphibious assault ship program was estimated to cost €375 million (US$500 million). Originally, the Turkish Navy wanted a slightly shorter flight deck without the forward ski-jump ramp, optimized for helicopter-only use. The service later opted for a fully equipped flight deck with the ski-jump after deciding to purchase Lockheed Martin F-35B STOVL aircraft. Turkey was a Level 3 partner in the Joint Strike Fighter program and the Turkish Air Force was to get the F-35A CTOL version. On 17 July 2019, the US removed Turkey from the F-35 program for purchasing the Russian S-400 missile system.

The Turkish version will be capable of operating up to 14 helicopters in "light aircraft carrier" configuration. Its displacement will be 24,660 tons (in "light aircraft carrier" mission configuration) or 27,079 tons (in "amphibious landing ship" mission configuration). It will have a  flight deck and a  aviation hangar which can accommodate either twelve medium-sized helicopters or eight CH-47F Chinook heavy-lift helicopters. When the aviation hangar and the light cargo garage are unified, up to 25 medium-sized helicopters can be carried, or up to twelve helicopters and twelve F-35 fighters. Six more helicopters can be hosted on the flight deck. Additionally, the ship will have a  light cargo garage for TEU containers and 27 Amphibious Assault Vehicles (AAV); a  dock which can host four Landing Craft Mechanized (LCM) or two Landing Craft Air Cushion (LCAC), or two Landing Craft Vehicle Personnel (LCVP); and a  garage for heavy loads, which can host 29 Main Battle Tanks (MBT), Amphibious Assault Vehicles and TEU containers. The crew will consist of 261 personnel: 30 officers, 49 NCOs, 59 leading seamen and 123 ratings.

The final contract for the ship's construction was signed with the Navantia-Sedef consortium on 7 May 2015. While the commissioning of the ship was scheduled for 2021 in the beginning, it was later revised to the end of 2022. The estimated cost according to the final specifications is $1 billion in 2015. Construction began on 30 April 2016 at the shipyard of Sedef Shipbuilding Inc. in Istanbul.

The construction of an identical sister ship, to be named TCG Trakya, is currently planned.

Ships

References

Bibliography

External links

 Official Web-site of the Spanish Navy (in Spanish) with information about the "Buque de Proyección Estratégica"
 Digital renderings of the finished vessel
  
 41 photographs Juan Carlos I (L61) launch in Revista Naval (Spanish)

Amphibious warfare vessel classes
Aircraft carriers of the Spanish Navy
Amphibious warfare vessels of the Spanish Navy
Ships built in Spain
2009 ships
Ships of the Spanish Navy